Uskallaqta (Quechua uska poor, llaqta place (village, town, city, country, nation), other spellings Juscallacta, Uscallacta, Uskallacta) is an archaeological complex with stone tombs (chullpa) and rooms in Peru. It is situated in the Arequipa Region, Caylloma Province, Chivay District, southwest of Chivay.

See also 
 Uyu Uyu

References

Archaeological sites in Arequipa Region
Archaeological sites in Peru
Tombs in Peru